Edward Lamar Simmons (born December 31, 1963) is a former American football offensive tackle who played his entire 11-year career with the Washington Redskins from 1987 to 1997 in the National Football League (NFL).  He played college football at Eastern Washington University and was drafted in the sixth round of the 1987 NFL Draft.

1963 births
Living people
American football offensive tackles
Eastern Washington Eagles football players
People from French Camp, California
Players of American football from California
Washington Redskins players
Ed Block Courage Award recipients